The Gift is a Portuguese alternative rock band, formed in 1994. They have released eight albums to date. In 2005 they won the MTV Europe award for best Portuguese act.

Biography

Formed in 1994, The Gift was initially a side project of the Dead Souls, Nuno Gonçalves, El Guam and Miguel Ribeiro’s band at the time. The evolution from one project to another was natural, as they felt the Dead Souls sound was limited by their instrumentation (guitar, drums and bass) and wanted to experiment with new sounds and explore new musical paths.

In September, 1994, Sónia Tavares, Nuno and John Gonçalves, Miguel Ribeiro, and Ricardo Braga enrolled in the Bar Ben Music Competition in Alcobaça, and took second place in the competition, to everyone's great surprise, given the band’s short time in existence.

The band performed its first show at the Alcobaça Monastery in July, 1995. This was followed by the Belém Cultural Centre (Lisbon) in September, 1996, and the Labirintho Bar (Porto) in November, 1996.

The Gift masterminded their first record, with the intention of using it as a demo for the media and labels. From this effort, “Digital Atmosphere” was born, a six track enhanced CD featuring interviews and videos, recorded at home but not available in stores. In 1997 the band went on the road, playing at over 30 theatres (many of which sold out) and released a video at the end of the tour at the Belém Cultural Centre and Alcobaça Cine-Teatro shows.

Soon after the Digital Atmosphere Tour finished, Ricardo Braga left the band, and The Gift was now a four-member group once again. In 1998, they established themselves as an independent band forming their own label, La Folie, with the visionary goal of releasing their next record as independents.

In November 1998,  the band's first true record Vinyl was released. Vinyl combined the potentials of new technologies (samples and synthesizer) with classical instruments (violins, cellos, trumpets, saxophones, etc.). Vinyl, which was fully funded by The Gift themselves, was named Album of the Year by the Diário de Notícias newspaper, a first for a Portuguese independent band, and began courting the attention of the labels that previously ignored The Gift's work. In spite of this, the band chose to stay independent, opting to use distribution contracts.

From November 1998 through 1999, the band performed over 80 shows, including the biggest Summer Festivals, selling out the most important venues in Lisbon and Porto, won several awards with the first hit single, “Ok! Do You Want Something Simple?” and sold over 35,000 records.

At the end of that year The Gift performed for the first time abroad in Paris (at La Cigalle), and a few months later participated in the prestigious music fair MIDEM 2000 (in Cannes), taking the first step towards the band's career outside Portugal.

In early 2000, the band closed the Vinyl era, simultaneously releasing the photo book A Single Diary (by Ana Pereira), and the video “Single Hand Camera Documentary” (by Gonçalo Covacich), two artistic visions and documentary pieces on the Vinyl Tour. Once again, all the costs incurred were covered by the band, establishing The Gift once and for all as a solid DIY
band.

The steps taken abroad continued to gain momentum in June 2000 with the band's first mini-tour outside Portugal, including dates in Germany (Expo 2000 – Hanover), Macau, and again, France (Paris).

At the end of the year The Gift took a break from touring and started writing songs for the next album, some of which were introduced later in 2001 at the Eurosonic Festival in the Netherlands, representing Portugal.

Howie B produced Film, The Gift's second album, was released, again through their own label, La Folie Records. The band showed its “Film” throughout the country, playing at the Paredes de Coura Festival, the optimushype@meco Festival (sharing the stage with Howie B and Matthew Herbert), at the Interactive TV's launch in Portugal, live for Sic Radical channel, and radio Antena 3.

Film went Gold at 25,000 units, and The Gift won several more awards for its videos (“Waterskin” and “Question of Love” – the album's first two singles). At the end of 2001, the band was once more invited by Cap Magellan to promote Film in Paris.

In March 2002, The Gift flew to the United States to enter the South by Southwest Music & Media Conference in Austin, Texas; in June they returned to Paris to perform at the Hôtel de Ville Square; in August Popkomm and Musikfest am Ring festivals in Germany; Spain followed in September with shows in Barcelona; in October the band was back in the US for a short tour in a few North-American cities (New York City); and in November its first concert in Madrid, Spain, took place.

Of the few performances in Portugal, the Manchester Mad Remixers (which featured The Gift together with Rodrigo Leão and Pedro Oliveira) concerts were a highlight (first at the nightclub Lux, and later at the Frágil and the Clinic bars). This was a project especially created for the 24 Hour Party People film's premiere.

The band performed in numerous places: Barcelona, Valencia, Madrid, Bilbao, Vigo, New York City, Philadelphia, Los Angeles, Boston, San Diego, London, Caracas, and Dunkirk, amongst many other cities.

The Gift was invited to open for The Flaming Lips and Cousteau, and at the end of the year, in December 2003, got an invitation to perform for the recently launched Portuguese MTV, recording one of the first MTV Live shows in the history of MTV Portugal.

In 2004, The Gift celebrated its first 10 years in music. By the end of the recording sessions, The Gift was faced with a double album, where two distinctive but complementary environments surfaced (one more intimate and introspective, the other more euphoric) and in which duality was the key word. The new release, the first in three years, is entitled AM-FM. AM-FM went Gold, selling more than 25,000 copies.

In 2005 they won the MTV Europe Award for Best Portuguese Act.

The song "11:33" from AM-FM is featured on the soundtrack of the football video game FIFA 06.

The album Fácil de Entender, their first live album, was released in 2006. It sold over 25,000 units.

The Gift performed with great success on the Expo 2008 Zaragoza, the day of Portugal, at the exhibition.

In 2008 and 2009, The Gift's Sónia Tavares and Nuno Gonçalves, along with fellow musicians, Paulo Praça [Plaza] and Fernando Ribeiro, recorded and toured with their side project Hoje. Amalia Hoje sold more than 85,000 units.

They invited Ken Nelson [Coldplay, Gomez, Kings of Convenience, Badly Drawn Boy] to produce their 5th Album.

2011 was the year of Explode. Explode was released in Portugal on 1 April and immediately went to number one in the charts.

In September 2016, the group released a new single featuring legendary British musician Brian Eno, titled Love Without Violins. Eno co-wrote and produced, as well as sang on the track. The single was released under the band's own record label, La Folie Records, on 30 September. A new album was also announced to be released in 2017, featuring the Grammy-nominated composer on several tracks, which he composed with the band's keyboardist Nuno Gonçalves, and mixed by legendary producer Flood. The Portuguese band will be sharing vocal duties and instruments with Eno, who also wrote the lyrics with singer Sónia Tavares. Following the release of the new single, The Gift were confirmed to play for the second time at Eurosonic Noorderslag in Groningen, NL.

Members

Current
 Sónia Tavares – lead vocals (1994–present)
 Nuno Gonçalves – keyboards, backing vocals, composer (1994–present)
 John Gonçalves – bass, keyboards (1994–present)
 Miguel Ribeiro – guitar, bass (1994–present)

Current touring musicians
 Mário Barreiros – drums (2006–present)
 Paulo Praça – guitar, bass  (2010–present)
 Israel Costa Pereira – guitar, backing vocals, keyboards (2011–present)

Former
 Ricardo Braga – keyboards, euphonium (1994–1998)

Former touring musicians
 Diogo Santos – drums (1998-2006)
 António Bruheim – saxophone (1999-2003)

Timeline

Awards
 2005 - MTV Europe Award for Best Portuguese Act

Discography

Albums
 Digital Atmosphere (1997) – demo tape without commercial release
 Vinyl (1998)
 Film (2001)
 AM-FM (2004)
 Fácil de Entender (2006)
 Explode (2011)
 Primavera (2012)
 Altar (2017)
 Verão (2019)

Singles
From Vinyl
"Ok! Do You Want Something Simple?" (1999)
"Real (Get Me For...)" (1999)
"Truth" (2000)

From Film
"Water Skin" (2001)
"Question of Love" (2001)

From AM-FM
"Driving You Slow" (2004)
"11:33" (2005)
"Music" (2005)

From Fácil de Entender
"Fácil de Entender" (2006)

From Explode
"RGB" (2011)

References

External links
 The Gift - Official Website
 The Gift - Official Store
 The Gift - Official Facebook Page
 The Gift - Official Youtube Channel
 The Gift - Official MySpace Site

Portuguese alternative rock groups
Musical groups established in 1994
Golden Globes (Portugal) winners
1994 establishments in Portugal
MTV Europe Music Award winners
People from Alcobaça, Portugal